In English, a curriculum vitae (Latin for "course of life", often shortened to CV) is a short written summary of a person's career, qualifications, and education. This is the most common usage in both North American and British English. In North America (but not elsewhere), the term résumé (also spelled resume) is a common synonym for CV in the sense of a short career summary. 

The term curriculum vitae and its abbreviation, CV, are also used especially in academia to refer to extensive or even complete summaries of a person's career, qualifications, and education, including publications and other information. This has caused the widespread misconception that it is incorrect to refer to short CVs as CVs in American English and that short CVs should be called résumés, but this is not supported by the usage recorded in American dictionaries. For example, the University of California, Davis notes that "[i]n the United States and Canada, CV and resume are sometimes used interchangeably" while describing the common distinction made in North-American academia between the use of these terms to refer to documents with different contents and lengths.

In many countries, a short CV is typically the first information that a potential employer receives from a job-seeker, and CVs are typically used to screen applicants, often followed by an interview. CVs may also be requested for applicants to postsecondary programs, scholarships, grants, and bursaries. In the 2010s it became popular for applicants to provide an electronic version of their CV to employers by email, through an employment website, or published on a job-oriented social-networking service such as LinkedIn.

Contents

General usage
In general usage in all English-speaking countries, a CV is short (usually a maximum of two sides of A4 paper), and therefore contains only a summary of the job seeker's employment history, qualifications, education, and some personal information. Such a short CV is often also called a résumé only in North America, where it is however also often called a CV outside academia. CVs are often tailored to change the emphasis of the information according to the particular position for which the job seeker is applying. A CV can also be extended to include an extra page for the jobseeker's publications if these are important for the job.

In academia
In academic and medical careers, a CV is usually a comprehensive document that provides extensive information on education, publications, and other achievements. Such a CV is generally used when applying for a position in academia, while shorter CVs (also called résumés in North America) are generally used when applying for a position in industry, non-profit organizations, and the public sector.

Etymology, spelling, and plural 
Curriculum vitae can be loosely translated as [the] course of [one's] life. It is a loanword from New Latin, which is why it was traditionally spelled  curriculum vitæ using the ligature æ also in English, but this is now rare.

In English, the plural of curriculum alone is often curriculums instead of the traditional Latin plural curricula, which is why both forms are recorded in English dictionaries. The English plural of curriculum vitae is however almost always curricula vitae as in Latin, and this is the only form recorded in the Merriam-Webster, American Heritage, and Oxford English dictionaries, for example. (The very rare claim that the Latin plural should be curricula vitarum is in fact an incorrect hypercorrection based on superficial knowledge of Latin.)

See also
 Applicant tracking system
 Background check
 Cover letter
 Europass – European Standardised model
 Human resources
 Résumé fraud
 Video résumé

References

External links 

 CV guide – Massachusetts Institute of Technology – Global Education & Career Development, United States
 Cover Letter guide – Massachusetts Institute of Technology – Global Education & Career Development, United States

Recruitment
Business documents
Latin words and phrases